Hilda Cathy Heine (born April 6, 1951) is a Marshallese educator and politician, who served as the eighth President of the Marshall Islands. Prior to assuming office, she served as the Minister of Education. She was the first individual from the Marshall Islands to earn a doctorate degree, and the founder of the women's rights group Women United Together Marshall Islands (WUTMI).

Heine was the first woman to hold the presidency of the Marshall Islands. She is also the first female president of any Micronesian country, and only the fourth woman to serve as head of government for any independent nation in Oceania (following Jenny Shipley and Helen Clark of New Zealand and Julia Gillard of Australia).

Early life and education
Heine was born on April 6, 1951, in Majuro Atoll, Marshall Islands. She attended college in the United States where she earned her undergraduate degree at the University of Oregon in 1970. She earned a master's degree at the University of Hawaiʻi at Mānoa in 1975 and an educational doctorate at the University of Southern California in 2004.

She received an honorary doctorate in philosophy from Fu Jen Catholic University in 2019.

Career

Heine worked at Marshall Islands High School in Majuro from 1975 through 1982, serving both as a classroom teacher and as a counselor. In 2000, Heine founded Women United Together Marshall Islands (WUTMI), a women's rights group. Since 2005, she had been Pacific Resources for Education and Learning's (PREL) Director at the Pacific Comprehensive Assistance Center. Heine participated in the 2009 with the Pacific Islands Climate Change Education Partnership. She has also been associated with the Leadership Pacific Advisory Board, the Commission on Education in Micronesia, and the Human Resources in Health Task Force.

Representing Aur Atoll in the Nitijeļā (Legislature), she became Minister of Education.

In January 2016 Aelon Kein Ad member Casten Nemra was elected as President of the Marshall Islands. Shortly afterwards Heine along with former Minister Thomas Heine and Wilbur Heine withdrew their support of Nemra and defected to the opposition. The decision was made after Thomas was not offered a positioned in the cabinet of Nemra. Nemra was shortly afterwards removed from office in a vote of no confidence, having been in office for only two weeks. Heine was chosen as the replacement candidate by the opposition. On January 27, 2016, as sole candidate, she received 24 votes with six abstaining and three absent from the 33 members of the Nitijeļā. Heine was sworn into office as President of the Marshall Islands on January 28, 2016. She became the first woman to hold the position. 

On November 12, 2018, Heine survived a vote of no confidence with the outcome in votes being 16-16, falling short of the 17 votes needed. Heine and Kitlang Kabua, were the only two women elected in the 2019 Marshallese general election. On January 6, 2020, she lost her bid for re-election in a 12-20 vote against David Kabua.

Heine was Chancellor of the University of the South Pacific (USP) from 1 July 2019 to 12 January 2020.  On 12 November 2021, the USP Council elected her as Pro-Chancellor and Chair of Council for a three-year term beginning 1 January 2022.

Further reading
Cox, J., Corbett, J., & Spark, C. (2020). "Being the president : Hilda Heine, gender and political leadership in the Marshall Islands." Small States & Territories, 3(2), 339-358.

References

External links

1951 births
Living people
21st-century Marshallese politicians
21st-century Marshallese women politicians
Female heads of state
Education ministers of the Marshall Islands
Marshallese schoolteachers
Members of the Legislature of the Marshall Islands
People from Majuro
Presidents of the Marshall Islands
University of Hawaiʻi at Mānoa alumni
University of Oregon alumni
USC Rossier School of Education alumni
Women government ministers of the Marshall Islands
Women presidents
Women heads of universities and colleges
Female heads of government